Lică Stavarache Movilă (born 21 October 1961) is a Romanian former footballer, who played primarily as a midfielder.

Club career
Lică Movilă was born in Brăila on 21 October 1961 and made his Divizia A debut on 21 June 1981 for SC Bacău in a 5–2 loss against Argeș Pitești. He spent three seasons with SC Bacău and midway through the 1982–83 season, he was transferred to Dinamo București, where in his first two seasons spent at the club he won the title appearing in 16 matches with 4 goals scored in the first one and 19 appearances and one goal in the second one. During his period spent at Dinamo, Movilă also won two Cupa României and played 16 games in which he scored two goals in European competitions, appearing in 7 games in which he scored one goal in the 1983–84 European Cup season when the team reached the semi-finals where in the first leg against Liverpool he got a punch from Graeme Souness that broke his jaw, but Souness did not receive the red card because the referee did not see the incident. After six seasons spent with The Red Dogs, Movilă spent a season each with Flacăra Moreni and Universitatea Cluj, reaching a total of 199 matches played in Divizia A with 23 goals scored. He played alongside fellow Romanian, Claudiu Vaișcovici in the 1991 Soviet First League for Zimbru Chișinău after which he finished his career playing one season for the Israeli side Hapoel Be'er Sheva.

International career
Lică Movilă played 14 games at international level in which he scored one goal for Romania, making his debut when coach Mircea Lucescu sent him on the field in the 70th minute in order to replace Gheorghe Mulțescu on 1 June 1983 in a friendly which ended with a 1–0 loss against Yugoslavia. He scored his only goal for the national team in a friendly which ended 2–2 against Poland, made a appearance at the 1986 World Cup qualifiers in a 3–2 away loss against Northern Ireland and on 8 April 1982, Movilă made his last appearance for the national team in a 3–2 victory against Israel.

International goals
Scores and results list Romania's goal tally first, score column indicates score after each Movilă goal.

Honours
Dinamo București
Divizia A: 1982–83, 1983–84
Cupa României: 1983–84, 1985–86

References

External links
 

1961 births
Living people
Sportspeople from Brăila
Romanian footballers
Romania international footballers
Liga I players
FCM Bacău players
FC Dinamo București players
CSM Flacăra Moreni players
FC Universitatea Cluj players
FC Zimbru Chișinău players
Hapoel Be'er Sheva F.C. players
Romania under-21 international footballers
Romanian expatriate footballers
Expatriate footballers in the Soviet Union
Romanian expatriate sportspeople in the Soviet Union
Expatriate footballers in Israel
Romanian expatriate sportspeople in Israel
Association football midfielders
Soviet First League players